Island council elections were held in the Netherlands Antilles in 1951. They were the first elections for the Island Council, and followed the establishment of the Island Councils of the Netherlands Antilles through the Islands Regulation of the Netherlands Antilles (ERNA).

Aruba
General elections were held in Aruba in June 1951. Five parties participated; the Aruban People's Party, the Aruban Patriotic Party, the Aruba Independence Party and – following a split in 1949 – a Catholic and Protestant branch of the Aruba National Union.

Results

Sint Maarten

General elections were held in Sint Maarten on 4 June 1951, the island's first elections based on universal suffrage. The result was a victory for the National People's Party, which won four of the five Island Council seats.

Results

References

1951 in Aruba
Netherlands Antilles
Elections in Aruba
Election and referendum articles with incomplete results